Siwana is a Tehsil in Barmer district in Indian state of Rajasthan, located 151 km from Barmer. The place is known for its fort which is locally known as Gadh Siwana, Gadh means Fort. Siwana have 130 villages. total Population as peris 213,648, 111,155 male and 102,493 female.

Siwana is nearest city Balotra 35 km from siwana.

Fort 

The ruined Siwana fort (Gadh Siwana) is situated on a hilltop. According to bardic tradition, Siwana was established by Vira-narayana, a son of the 11th century Paramara king Bhoja.

In 1308, Alauddin Khalji of Delhi Sultanate defeated Sitala Deva, the local ruler. To commemorate Sitala Deva's heroic defence of the fort, an annual fair called the Kalyan Singh Ka Mela is still held within the precincts of the fort in the month of Shraavana (July-Aug). Later, in the  period 1318–20, Luntiga Chauhan stormed the fort of Siwana and slaughtered its Muslim garrison. It was later captured by the Rathors of Marwar and remained a part of Marwar until independence of India. Siwana was the capital of Rao Chandrasen Rathore when he had opposed the Mughal emperor. Siwana was captured by badshah Akbar in 1576, but was later restored to Raja Udai Singh of Marwar.

Notable people 

The present MLA of Siwana is Hameer Singh Bhayal from BJP who defeated Nirmal Daas from Congress.. Motilal Oswal, an entrepreneur in the financial services space was born in a small village of Padru of the Siwana tehsil.

References

Cities and towns in Barmer district
Tehsils of Barmer district